Joseph Patrick O'Hara (January 23, 1895 – March 4, 1975) was a U.S. Representative from Minnesota.

Early life
O'Hara was born in Tipton, Cedar County, Iowa, on January 23, 1895. He attended the public schools and graduated from Spirit Lake, Iowa, High School. During the First World War, he was commissioned as a second lieutenant of the Infantry in the Officers’ Reserve Corps and later promoted to captain in the Quartermaster Corps, serving from May 13, 1917, to August 15, 1919. With overseas service, he was commissioned as a major of Infantry in the Reserve Corps.

O'Hara also attended Inns of Court, London, England, and graduated from the law department of University of Notre Dame, South Bend, Indiana. In 1920, he was admitted to the bar in 1921, and was commenced practice in Glencoe, Minnesota.

Careers
O'Hara served as an attorney for various villages, cities, towns, and school districts, as well as county attorney of McLeod County (1934 – 1938).

He was then elected as a Republican to the 77th, 78th, 79th, 80th, 81st, 82nd, 83rd, 84th and the 85th congresses on January 3, 1941 – January 3, 1959.

World War II
O'Hara was an outspoken ally of Charles Lindbergh, and was avowed isolationist. This was considered particularly aggregious at the time because this was after the fall of France and before Hitler's invasion of the Soviet Union, and at that time Britain was very much alone. After an especially contentious argument outside of congress over a bill titled H.R. 1776 (which provided funding for the British military in early 1941), Edward E. Cox, Stephen Pace, Paul Brown, Albert Sidney Camp, Carl Vinson, Sam Hobbs, Pete Jarman, Henry B. Steagall, George M. Grant, Frank W. Boykin, L. Mendel Rivers, James P. Richards, Hampton P. Fulmer, Herbert Covington Bonner and John L. McMillan all denounced O'Hara to the press. All 15 of the aforementioned southern representatives attacked O'Hara personally when speaking to the media. Richards said that O'Hara's "lack of manhood was only surpassed by his lack of sense." George M. Grant called O'Hara "two-faced and gutless." Hery B Steagall said it was "unfortunate that Mr. O'Hara has no sense of honor." Herbert Covington Bonner called him "unmanly and shameful." Hampton P. Fulmer said O'Hara was "nothing but a damned fool." Peter Jarman said that "When Hitler says jump, Mr. O'Hara asks How High?." When asked "Do you respect Representative O'Hara?", Albert Sidney Camp responded "No!" Edward E. Cox said that it was "a shame, because Joseph O'Hara was a man once."

O'Hara voted against the Civil Rights Act of 1957.

He was not a candidate for reelection in 1958 to the 86th congress, but he resumed the practice of law in Washington, D.C., where he resided. He died in Bethesda, MD, on March 4, 1975. His interment is in Gate of Heaven Cemetery in Silver Spring, Maryland.

References

Bibliography

1895 births
1975 deaths
University of Notre Dame alumni
Republican Party members of the United States House of Representatives from Minnesota
People from Tipton, Iowa
People from Spirit Lake, Iowa
People from Glencoe, Minnesota
Burials at Gate of Heaven Cemetery (Silver Spring, Maryland)
20th-century American politicians
Notre Dame Law School alumni